Velsky Uyezd was one of the subdivisions of the Vologda Governorate of the Russian Empire. It was situated in the western part of the governorate. Its administrative centre was Velsk.

Demographics
At the time of the Russian Empire Census of 1897, Velsky Uyezd had a population of 102,484. Of these, 99.9% spoke Russian as their native language.

References

 
Uezds of Vologda Governorate
Vologda Governorate